Seth was the third son of Adam and Eve in the Bible.

Seth may also refer to:
 Strong exponential time hypothesis
Seth (given name)
Seth (surname)
Seth (cartoonist)
Seth, Germany
Seth Material, a collection of writings allegedly from "Seth" a disembodied entity channeled by Jane Roberts
Set (deity), also known as Seth
 Seth (band), a French Black metal band; see Originators of the Northern Darkness – A Tribute to Mayhem
 Cyclone Seth (2021), a weak tropical cyclone that made landfall on Australia

See also
Seath (disambiguation)
Sethi (disambiguation)
Sethianism
Sheth, a surname
Sef Gonzales, Filipino Australian murderer who murdered members of his own family